288 Wimbledon Road is an historic house located in Irondequoit in Monroe County, New York.

Description and history 
The building was constructed in 1928 by Fred P. Tosch Inc. as the Democrat & Chronicle's Master Model Home. The house was cosponsored and promoted by the Democrat & Chronicle and The Home Owner's Service Institute as an all-encompassing demonstration house used to promote high quality design and cutting edge products to middle income families as part of the nationwide Better Homes Movement occurring during the 1920s. It is a -story building executed in the Tudor Revival style. The primary facade features a distinctive composition of three asymmetrically concentric gables with gridded false timbering and tinted stucco panels atop a large bay window.

Of particular note was the use of early experimental Kodacolor motion picture film to document the process of construction. The captured moments were organized into a brief presentation for the public who visited the home during its four-week open house.

It was listed on the National Register of Historic Places on November 24, 2015.

References

Houses on the National Register of Historic Places in New York (state)
Tudor Revival architecture in New York (state)
Houses completed in 1928
Houses in Monroe County, New York
National Register of Historic Places in Monroe County, New York